Ethmia oculigera is a moth in the  family Depressariidae.

Distribution
It is found in Congo, Ghana, Kenya, Nigeria, Madagascar and South Africa.

References
Möschler, H. B. 1884. Beiträge zur Schmetterlings-fauna des Kaffernlandes. - Verhandlungen der zoologisch-botanischen Gesellschaft Wien 33(1883):267–310, pl. 16

Moths described in 1884
oculigera
Moths of Africa